I'll Be the Tornado is the second and final studio album by American emo band Dads. It was released on October 14, 2014 in the United States.

Critical reception

I'll Be the Tornado has received positive reviews from music critics. Metacritic, which assigns a normalized rating out of 100 to reviews from mainstream critics, the album received an average score of 81, based on five reviews.

Track listing

Charts

References 

2014 albums
Dads (band) albums